George Mendes is the executive chef of Aldea, a Michelin starred restaurant in New York City.

Career

Mendes was raised in Danbury, Connecticut. He graduated from the Culinary Institute of America in 1992, and later worked at Bouley under the instruction of chef David Bouley. He subsequently trained under Alain Passard at L'Arpege in Paris.

In 1996, Mendes was recruited by Bouley to become the executive chef of Le Zoo. In 1998, he began working under chef Sandro Gamba at Lespinasse in Washington, D.C. where he learned how to create the restaurant's  "French luxe cuisine".

In 2016, he was featured on the "Our Portuguese Table" hosted by Angela Simões and Maria Lawton.

See also
List of Michelin starred restaurants

References

External links
Aldea

Living people
American chefs
American male chefs
American people of Portuguese descent
Head chefs of Michelin starred restaurants
People from New York (state)
Year of birth missing (living people)